Arboria is a dark fantasy 3D rogue-lite game developed by Dreamplant and published by All in! Games. The game was released for Microsoft Windows in Early Access on Steam in May 2020 with a full release planned for 2021.

Gameplay 
In Arboria, the player becomes a Yotun warrior. The goal is to explore the dungeons of Durnar and overcome enemies to heal The Father-Tree, Yggr, and collect a material called Veri to satisfy Godz. The gameworld is a mixture of dark fantasy aesthetic and mysterious, technologically advanced machinery, while some elements were inspired by Norse mythology.

Yotunz fight with a range of Symbiotic Weapons and use Bio-Mutations to become stronger. Upon death, the player takes the role of a new Yotun and can use the previously gathered Veri to upgrade the warrior. If the previous run was successful, the new character will be stronger; if not, he may receive negative traits.

Durnar is procedurally generated, so every run is different. The difficulty increases as the player progresses through different areas and main maps are separated by a special chamber, where the players can upgrade their Yotun warrior before moving forward.

Development 
Arboria was first announced in 2019 and became available in Early Access on Steam in 2020. The full release is planned for 2021.

References

External links 

 Official website

2020 video games
Action role-playing video games
Dark fantasy video games
Roguelike video games
Video games developed in Poland
Video games based on Norse mythology
Video games using procedural generation
Windows games
Windows-only games
All in! Games games